Luc Marius Ibriga (27 September 1956 – 25 December 2022) was a Burkinabé academic and jurist. A law professor at the University of Ouagadougou, he was president of the Autorité supérieure de contrôle de l’État.

Biography
Ibriga was born in Korhogo in Ivory Coast on 27 September 1956. He then moved to Burkina Faso, his native country, where he spent his university studies.

Luc Marius Ibriga died in Ouagadougou on 25 December 2022, at the age of 66.

References

1956 births
2022 deaths
Burkinabé lawyers
Academic staff of the University of Ouagadougou
People from Korhogo